On 23 September 2021, Catalan MEP Carles Puigdemont for Spain, who has been in exile since 2017, was arrested at the Alghero–Fertilia Airport by the Italian police after getting off of a flight from  Brussels. The arrest took place following a Spanish Supreme Court European Arrest Warrant issued in 2019. At a court hearing the day after his arrest, he was released without any precautionary measures, in line with the Italian prosecutor's request. The purpose of the trip was to meet with Algheresi authorities and Sardinian separatist and at the same time to attend the Aplec International in Adifolk which was to take place in the "Barceloneta of Sardinia" between 24 and 26 September.

The announcement of the arrest prompted Puigdemont to regain a prominent role and to be at the centre of the Catalan political scene. One day after his release, during a press conference Puigdemont announced that he would attend an oral hearing scheduled to take place on 4 October in the Sassari court, together with his lawyer Gonzalo Boye.

References 

Alghero
September 2021 events in Italy
September 2021 events in Spain
2021 in Catalonia
Extradition